Tragalassus or Tragalassos was a town of ancient Lycia.

Its site is located near Karabel in Asiatic Turkey.

References

Populated places in ancient Lycia
Former populated places in Turkey